Melowy is an Italian children's book series and comic book series with a target demographic of girls 7-12 written by Danielle Star. The books chronicle the tale of unicorns with special wings, as well as magic abilities, during their stay at the Castle of Destiny and Castle of Chance boarding schools.

Development
Danielle Star wrote the script for the first 12 books before submitting them to Alessandra Berello, publisher manager at Atlantyca Entertainment, who she began frequently chatting with on E-mail, including to discuss and approve the characters' clothes and accessories.

Lead characters
 Cleo (Clio): Home realm unknown, having grown up at the Castle of Destiny and was raised by the castle's chef.
 Electra (Elettra): From the Day Realm.
 Selene: From the Night Realm.
 Cora (Kora): From the Winter Realm. Likes to go ice skating.
 Maya (Maia): From the Spring Realm. Likes to cook food.

Books

Comics
In contrast to the books, the comics were created in the United States by Papercutz and had English as their original language.

Toys

A one-wave, 12-figure toyline was released in Italy in 2015 that predated both the books and the comics.

Reception

The Sunday Telegraph (Sydney) wrote about Dreams Come True that "With bright coloured illustrations", "the Melowy series will appeal to new independent readers.", while Kirkus Reviews wrote that while formulaic, "the audience it’s carefully calculated to appeal to will probably adore it." First Comics News wrote about The Test of Magic that it was a "younger reader book but can be enjoyed by any age.", and that the characters were "adorable" and "sickly sweet", Booklist wrote that it would appeal to "Fans of whimsical, effervescent comics", while BSCKids wrote that "The characters are fun" and that the "coloring and artwork really bring out their personalities". Cairns Post listed The Night of Courage as a "Good Reads" in its Northern Family section.

The first book (Il sogno si avvera) was number 8 on the kids literature list of La Stampa Tuttolibri's publishing of Italian BookScan weekly bestsellers for 27 March through 2 April 2016. The following week, it was placed 4th in Corriere della Sera's kids literature sales charts for 11–17 April 2016.

Translations

In addition to Italian and English, the books have been translated to French, Spanish, Catalan, Basque, Portuguese, Polish, Russian, and Greek. However, only the Italian version received all 15 books.

Notes

References

External links
 
 Italian official website
 Official comics website

Italian books
American comics titles
Series of children's books
Fantasy books by series